Doug Hill may refer to:

 Doug Hill (meteorologist), American television meteorologist
 Doug Hill (footballer) (1884–1968), Australian rules footballer